Antonio Kurtis Hester (born May 22, 1990) is an American professional basketball player for Magnolia Hotshots of the Philippine Basketball Association (PBA). In 2014, he won the Peruvian championship with Real Club de Lima and in 2018, he won the Icelandic Basketball Cup with Tindastóll. Listed at 198 cm, he primarily plays the power forward and center positions.

College career
Hester was named NAIA Third-Team All-American in 2012 after averaging 15.5 points and 8.6 rebounds for the University of Mobile.

Professional career

Early career
In 2012, Hester joined Turun NMKY of the Finnish First Division.

In 2014, Hester played for Real Club of Lima in the Liga de Basket de Lima, helping them win the Peruvian championship in July that year.

He played for CB Tarragona during the 2014–15 LEB Plata season, averaging 13.4 points and 7.6 rebounds. In September 2014, he helped the club to victory in the LEB Catalan basketball league and was named the finals MVP.

Tindastóll
In August 2016, Hester signed with Tindastóll of the Icelandic Úrvalsdeild karla. A month later, Tindastóll released Hester to sign Mamadou Samb. In November, Tindastóll brought Hester back as a part of a major roster overhaul where they fired head coach José Maria Costa and released Samb and Pape Seck. For the season he averaged 23.5 points and 10.7 rebounds in 32.0 minutes per game. Tindastóll finished third in the league but despite home court advantage, it lost to Keflavík in the first round of the playoffs.

In June 2017, Hester re-signed with Tindastóll for the 2017–2018 season. In November 2017, Hester injured his ankle badly and was initially thought to have broken it. Further tests revealed that the ankle was unbroken and that recovery time would be in weeks, not months.

On January 13, 2018, Hester helped Tindastóll to its first major title when it won the Icelandic Basketball Cup.

For the season, Hester averaged 20.6 points and 8.7 rebounds in 25.3 minutes per game, helping Tindastóll to a 16–6 record and the third seed in the playoffs.

In the playoffs, Tindastóll swept Grindavík, 3–0, in the first round, advancing to the semi-finals against ÍR. In the fifth game of the semi-finals on April 13, 2018, Hester injured his ankle. Despite the injury, Tindastóll prevailed in the game and advanced to the Úrvalsdeild finals. Although hobbled, Hester played in the first game of the finals series against four-time defending champions of KR. There he injured his other ankle after trying to block a shot from Brynjar Þór Björnsson, resulting in him missing game two of the series. Without him, Tindastóll staged a spirited performance, blowing out KR on their own homecourt, 98–70, and tying the series at one game apiece. After the season he was named the Úrvalsdeild Karla Foreign Player of the Year.

Starwings Basel and Bàsquet Girona
In December 2018, Hester signed with Starwings Basel of the Swiss Basketball League. In 14 games, he averaged 19.9 points and 9.6 rebounds per game.

Hester spent the 2019–2020 season with Bàsquet Girona in LEB Plata where he averaged 13.1 points and 8.3 rebounds in 25 games. On August 27, 2020, he signed with Força Lleida.

Return to Iceland
In January 2021, Hester returned to Iceland and signed with Njarðvík. For the season he averaged a team leading 	18.4 points and league leading 12.0 rebounds per game. During the last game of the season, he had 30 points and 20 rebounds. He helped Njarðvík win its last three games, where he averaged 23.7 points 13.3 rebounds, staving of relegation but missing out on the playoffs on a tie-breaker with Tindastóll.

Philippines
In November 2021, Hester signed with Terrafirma Dyip of the Philippine Basketball Association.

In December 2022, he signed with Zamboanga Valientes of the ASEAN Basketball League.

In February 2023, Hester signed with the Magnolia Hotshots of the Philippine Basketball Association (PBA) to replace Erik McCree as the team's import for the 2023 PBA Governors' Cup.

Awards, titles and accomplishments

Individual awards
NAIA Third-Team All-American: 2012
LEB Catalan Finals MVP: 2014
Úrvalsdeild Karla Foreign Player of the Year: 2018

Titles
Peruvian League: 2014
LEB Catalan basketball league: 2014
Icelandic Basketball Cup: 2018

References

External links 
 
 
 Antonio Hester at RealGM.com
 Antonio Hester at Proballers.com
 Finnish statistics at Basket.fi
 Icelandic statistics at Icelandic Basketball Association
 Spanish statistics at Baloncestoenvivo.feb.es

1990 births
Living people
American expatriate basketball people in the Dominican Republic
American expatriate basketball people in Finland
American expatriate basketball people in Iceland
American expatriate basketball people in the Philippines
American expatriate basketball people in Spain
American expatriate basketball people in Switzerland
American men's basketball players
CB Tarragona players
Centers (basketball)
Força Lleida CE players
Magnolia Hotshots players
Miami Dade Sharks men's basketball players
Miami Norland Senior High School alumni
Mobile Rams athletes
Njarðvík men's basketball players
Philippine Basketball Association imports
Power forwards (basketball)
Terrafirma Dyip players
Ungmennafélagið Tindastóll men's basketball players
Úrvalsdeild karla (basketball) players
Zamboanga Valientes players
American men's 3x3 basketball players